Mircea Valentin Leasă (born 22 February 1999) is a Romanian professional footballer who plays as a defender.

Honours

FC Voluntari
Liga II: 2014–15
Romanian Cup: 2016–17
Romanian Supercup: 2017

References

External links
 
 

1999 births
Living people
Romanian footballers
Association football midfielders
Liga I players
Liga II players
Liga III players
FC Dinamo București players
FC Voluntari players
ACS Viitorul Târgu Jiu players
FC Rapid București players